The McLean family were an Australian rugby clan who between them played 77 Tests for the Australian national rugby union team and a number of Tests for the Australian national rugby league team.

The main grandstand at Ballymore, the home of the Queensland Rugby Union, is named the McLean Stand in honour of the family's contribution to Queensland rugby and Australian rugby.

Doug McLean Sr.

Douglas James McLean  (1880–1947) was the patriarch. He was a pioneer Australian representative rugby union and  rugby league player, a dual code international. He represented with the Wallabies in 3 Tests and as a Kangaroo in 2 Tests.

Doug had three sons (Doug Jr., Bill, and Jack) who also played for Australia. Three of his grandsons did as well.

Doug McLean Jr.

Alexander Douglas McLean  (1912–1961), played 10 Tests for the Wallabies between 1933 and 1936. He too was a dual code international, playing two Kangaroo Tests on the wing and making the 1937 Kangaroo tour of Great Britain.

Bill McLean

William Malcolm McLean (1918–1996) played 5 Tests as captain of the Wallabies immediately after World War II. He was selected to lead the national side to tour  1947-48 Australia rugby union tour of Britain, Ireland, France and North America. He badly broke a leg early in the tour and did not play in any further Tests. As a Captain in 2/3rd Commando Squadron (Australia) he saw action against the Japanese in World War II.

Jack McLean
Jack McLean was a member of the 1946 Wallaby team that toured New Zealand though he didn't make the Test XV.

Bob McLean
A fourth son of Doug McLean Sr was Bob McLean. He had two sons who won Test caps: Jeff and Paul.

Jeff McLean
Jeffrey James McLean (26 January 1948 – 6 August 2010) played 13 times for the Wallabies between 1971 and 1974 on the wing. He debuted in 1971 against the Springboks. His final Wallaby appearance in the 1st Test of 1974 against the All Blacks was also the representative debut of his younger brother Paul. He died in 2010, aged 62, from cancer.

Paul McLean

Paul Edward McLean born 12 Oct 1953 at Ipswich, Queensland was the most feted and successful footballer of the family. Paul was capped 31 times between 1974 and 1982, scoring 263 points for the Wallabies playing at fly-half, fullback or center. He made his Wallaby debut in the first Test of 1974 against the All Blacks.

Paul McLean was President of the Australian Rugby Union between 2005 and 2009.

Peter McLean
Bill's son Peter William McLean born 8 Feb 1954 in Brisbane, Queensland also represented at lock for the Wallabies. He made 16 Test appearances between 1978 and 1982, playing 11 times alongside his cousin Paul. His Wallaby debut was in the first Test of 1978 against the All Blacks.

See also
List of international rugby union families

Sources
 The Spirit of Rugby 1995 (Collection of Essays), HarperCollins: Australia

References

Australian rugby league players
Australian rugby union players
McLean family (Australia)
People educated at Brisbane State High School